Peter Ryalls (29 January 1938 – 26 August 2017) was a British racing cyclist. He rode in the 1961 Tour de France.

References

1938 births
2017 deaths
British male cyclists
Place of birth missing